Russell Middlemiss (6 July 1929 – 5 August 2019) was an Australian rules footballer who played with Geelong in the VFL during the early 1950s. Middlemiss was a half back flanker and was an important player in defence for Geelong in their back to back premiership triumphs. His son, Glen Middlemiss, also played for Geelong, as well as St Kilda.

References

External links

1929 births
2019 deaths
Australian rules footballers from Victoria (Australia)
Geelong Football Club players
Geelong Football Club Premiership players
Two-time VFL/AFL Premiership players